Rodney Lucas (born December 11, 1982), better known by his stage name F.Stokes (pronounced "F Dot Stokes"), is an American rapper from South Side, Chicago, Illinois.

Early life
Rodney Lucas is originally from South Side, Chicago, Illinois. Around the age of 11, he moved to Madison, Wisconsin. He attended Madison West High School. At the age of 19, he moved to New York City, New York. He interned at Def Jam Recordings and worked at Grandstand Entertainment.

Career
Lucas' stage name, F.Stokes, derives from Flukey Stokes, who lived in his Chicago neighborhood growing up.

In 2009, he released a collaborative studio album with producer Lazerbeak, titled Death of a Handsome Bride. In 2012, he released the Love, Always EP. In 2013, he released a studio album, Fearless Beauty, entirely produced by Paper Tiger. In that year, he appeared as a rap coach on the MTV television series Made. He starred in the 2015 short film Melville.

Style and influences
In a 2012 interview, F.Stokes stated that his early works reflected his environment such as pimps and gangsters. His music has also been influenced by Patti Smith, Johnny Cash, Miles Davis, and Kanye West.

Discography

Studio albums
 Death of a Handsome Bride (2009) 
 Fearless Beauty (2013)

Mixtapes
 F.I.L.M. (Forever I Love Madison) (2009)
 Baked Goods (2011)

EPs
 Remnants of a Broken Soul (2010)
 Love, Always (2012)
 Liquor Sto' Diaries (2014)
 A Princess Named Leroy (2015)

Singles
 "Shaka Zulu" (2013)
 "1954" (2013)
 "Carpe Diem" (2013)

Guest appearances
 Mister Modo & Ugly Mac Beer - "He's Alive" from Remi Domost (2010)
 Mister Modo & Ugly Mac Beer - "Diggin' in the Crates" from Modonut 2 (2011)
 Deadlinz - "Head to the Sky" from Sonik Fiktion (2012)
 Bastille - "Love Don't Live Here" from Other People's Heartache (2012)
 Bastille - "Basement" from Other People's Heartache Part 2 (2012)
 Mister Modo & Ugly Mac Beer - "Ghost to the Ghetto" and "The Preacher" from Night Time Stories (2018)

Filmography

Short films
 Melville (2015)

Television
 Made (2013)

References

External links
 
 

1982 births
Living people
Rappers from Chicago
American male rappers
21st-century American rappers
Madison West High School alumni
21st-century American male musicians